Mynydd Llandegai Football Club  is a Welsh football team based in Mynydd Llandegai, Gwynedd, North Wales.  The team currently play in the North Wales Coast West Football League Premier Division, which is at the fourth tier of the Welsh football league system.

History
The club were Caernarfon & District League champions in the 2012–13 season and were promoted to the Gwynedd League in 2013–14. They were promoted in two successive seasons to the Welsh Alliance League Division Two in 2014–15, and Division One in 2015–16.

The club joined the newly formed North Wales Coast Football League in the West Premier Division when announced in 2020.

Honours
Caernarfon & District League – Champions: 2012–13
Caernarfon & District League Division One – Runners-up: 2009–10
Caernarfon & District League Division Two – Runners-up: 2007–08
Caernarfon & District Super Cup – Winners: 2012–13
North Wales Coast FA Junior Challenge Cup – Winners: 2009–10

External links
Official club website

References

Welsh Alliance League clubs
North Wales Coast Football League clubs
Gwynedd League clubs
Football clubs in Wales
Sport in Gwynedd
Caernarfon & District League clubs